Thomas Bunbury Gough (1777–1860) was a Dean of the Church of Ireland.

Gough was born in County Limerick; and educated at Trinity College, Dublin. He was Chancellor of Ardfert from 1811 until 1815; and Dean of Derry from 1820 until his death.

References

1777 births
1860 deaths
Alumni of Christ Church, Oxford
19th-century Irish Anglican priests
Deans of Derry
Clergy from County Limerick